Gaeunpo Station is a railway station of the Donghae Line in Nam-gu, Ulsan, South Korea.

Originally, this station was opened as Seonam Station on August 20, 1992, and then reopened as Gaeunpo Station on December 28, 2021.

External links

Railway stations in Ulsan
Nam District, Ulsan
Korail stations
Railway stations opened in 1992